Rod Coneybeare (March 31, 1930 – September 5, 2019) was a Canadian, writer,  puppeteer and voice actor, best known for his work on the long-lived Canadian children's program The Friendly Giant, where he performed as both Jerome the Giraffe, who would appear in the window, and Rusty the rooster, who lived in a book bag.

Back in April 1959 Coneybeare became the editor-in-chief and host of Man to Man, one of the first CBC radio shows intended specifically for men.

In addition to his work on The Friendly Giant, Coneybeare collaborated with Charles Winter on the radio program The Rod and Charles Show. With Robert Gibbons, producer of Mr. Dressup, Coneybeare created the short-lived CBC TV series The Bananas.

Coneybeare was also a writer. He wrote dozens of original radio dramas for the Canadian Broadcasting Corporation. During the 1950s, he wrote original plays which were performed on live television, and in 1978 he won an ACTRA Award for his radio fantasy The Man Who Hated Dogs.  He had already won an earlier ACTRA Award, in 1974, for his radio documentary celebrating the music of Frank Sinatra.

Coneybeare also worked as a voice actor for several cartoons. He has supplied the voice of Avalanche in X-Men and voiced several characters in The Adventures of Tintin, Babar, Cadillacs and Dinosaurs, The Busy World of Richard Scarry, Blazing Dragons, Dog City, The Magic School Bus, Little Shop and The Adventures of Super Mario Bros. 3.

He is the father of writer and filmmaker Wilson Coneybeare.

References

External links

CBC Digital Archives, Rod Coneybeare

1930 births
Canadian puppeteers
Canadian male voice actors
Canadian television producers
2019 deaths